Conrad Rautenbach (born 12 November 1984) is a rally driver from Zimbabwe who competed in the World Rally Championship for the Citroën Junior Team along with his co-driver Daniel Barritt. He won the African Rally Championship twice, in 2007 and 2011.

Career

He drove for the privately run PH Sport team with Urmo Aava in a Citroën C4 WRC for the 2008 season, where he achieved points finishes on two occasions, an 8th at Rally Turkey and a best result of 4th at the Rally Argentina. However, he also had some bizarre moments in 2008, not least of which the now infamous collision with Sébastien Loeb at the Jordan Rally where both cars managed to collide head-on forcing both to retire instantly.

For 2009 Rautenbach joined the Citroën Junior Team where he continued to campaign in a Citroën C4 WRC. On Rally Ireland, the first event of the season, Rautenbach had a promising first day, setting stage times consistently in the top eight, and ended the day in fifth place. However an off early on day two saw him slip down the standings, eventually finishing 18th in the rally. 2009 has continued to be an inconsistent season for Rautenbach, with retirements in Rally Norway, Rally Portugal and Rally Argentina, however, he did achieve points finishes at the Cyprus Rally and the Acropolis Rally, finishing 6th and 5th respectively. He did not get a seat for the next season and has not competed in WRC since.

Due to a lack of funding in 2010, Rautenbach only competed in the South African National Rally Championship with a Ford Fiesta S2000. He returned to the African championship in 2011, winning it for the second time.

His father, Billy Rautenbach, is also a former rally driver.

WRC results

JWRC results

Dakar Rally results

References

External links

Rallybase.nl profile

1984 births
Living people
World Rally Championship drivers
Zimbabwean rally drivers
White Zimbabwean sportspeople
Afrikaner people
Dakar Rally drivers
Citroën Racing drivers